Otthon is an unincorporated community in the Canadian province of Saskatchewan.

The Otthon post office, opened in 1898, (closing briefly between 1898 and 1899) and then remained open until December 31, 1968.  Otthon was established in 1894 by Hungarian settlers, with the name Otthon meaning home in the Hungarian language.  The initial settlers were led by Rev. Janos Kovacs of the  Hungarian Reformed Church in Pennsylvania.  The settlement attracted Hungarian miners working in Pennsylvania as well as immigrants directly from Hungary

Demographics 

References 

Cana No. 214, Saskatchewan
Designated places in Saskatchewan
Unincorporated communities in Saskatchewan
Division No. 5, Saskatchewan